A Darboux basis may refer to:
 A Darboux basis of a symplectic vector space
 In differential geometry, a Darboux frame on a surface
 A Darboux tangent in the dovetail joint

Mathematics disambiguation pages